In 1923, the U.S. state of Virginia renumbered many of its state highways. This renumbering was caused by the increase in mileage. Note that old SR 26 was removed entirely.

List of routes

Two-digit routes

Spur routes

 Renumbering 1923
Highway renumbering in the United States
 Renumbering 1923

References
Virginia Highways Project
CTB Meeting Archives